Merrifieldia tridactyla, also known as the western thyme plume, is a moth of the family Pterophoridae, first described by Carl Linnaeus in his 10th edition of Systema Naturae in 1758. It is known from most of Europe, as well as North Africa and Asia Minor.

Description
It is very similar to Merrifieldia leucodactyla Certain identification requires examination of the genitalia.
Adults are on wing from June to July in western Europe.

The larvae feed on Thymus species, including Breckland thyme (Thymus serpyllum) and common thyme (Thymus vulgaris), and mint (Mentha species) in Europe. In Saudi Arabia, larvae have been recorded feeding on the fruits of Cucurbita moschata. The young larvae nibble the fruit skin, but older larvae eat large areas in the fruit, causing discoloration and surface dryness. Pupation usually takes place on the upper-surface of the leaf.

References

External links
 First Record of a Pterophorid Moth, Merrifieldia tridactyla, Causing Damage to Long Guard Fruits Cucurbita moschata (Cucurbitaceae) in Saudi Arabia
 UKmoths

tridactyla
Moths described in 1758
Plume moths of Africa
Plume moths of Asia
Plume moths of Europe
Moths of Asia
Taxa named by Carl Linnaeus